The Priscilla Chan and Mark Zuckerberg San Francisco General Hospital and Trauma Center (ZSFG) is a public hospital in San Francisco, California, under the purview of the city's Department of Public Health. It serves as the only Level I trauma center for the 1.5 million residents of San Francisco and northern San Mateo County. It is the largest acute inpatient and rehabilitation hospital for psychiatric patients in the city. Additionally, it is the only acute hospital in San Francisco that provides 24-hour psychiatric emergency services.

In addition to the approximately 3,500 San Francisco municipal employees, the University of California, San Francisco (UCSF) provides approximately 1,500 employees (including physicians, nurses and ancillary personnel), and the SFGH serves as one of the teaching hospitals for the UCSF School of Medicine. The hospital, especially its Ward 86, was instrumental in treating and identifying early cases of AIDS. A new San Francisco General Hospital acute care building was completed in 2016 for a total approximate cost of $1.02 billion. A $75 million donation by Facebook founder Mark Zuckerberg and his wife Priscilla Chan covered approximately 7.35% of the overall cost. In recognition, the hospital was renamed after the couple.

The hospital is a safety net hospital additionally serving poor, elderly people, uninsured working families, and immigrants. As of 2014, 92 percent of the patient population at SFGH either receives publicly funded health insurance (Medicare or Medi-Cal) or is uninsured.

SFGH is rare in that its emergency rooms do not have agreements in place with private health care insurance providers. Until 2019, privately insured patients were often billed the balance of their care, which could be sizable. This practice was changed after media attention regarding the hospital's billing practices.

SFGH provided $74,620,877 of services with unrecovered payments in year ending 2020-06-30.

History 

In 1850, a California state bill appropriated $50,000 to build a State Marine Hospital in San Francisco.

In 1851, the United States Congress established the U.S. Marine Hospital, San Francisco at Rincon Point and relocated to the Presidio of San Francisco in 1875.

In 1855, the State Marine Hospital building was transitioned to the City and County Hospital of San Francisco, funded by every vessel that entered the port, paying inspection fees, to a public health officer.

By 1857, the City and County Hospital had located to the former North Beach School, at the southwest corner of Francisco and Stockton Streets. San Francisco opened its first permanent hospital in 1857.

A hospital has been at Potrero Avenue since 1872, when the city of San Francisco built a 400-bed hospital on Potrero, an all wood hospital, one of four emergency hospitals eventually built by 1904, Central, Harbor, Park and Potrero.

Expansions to the site have been made in 1909 (Mission Emergency Hospital), 1915 (four main, distanced, ward buildings), 1924 (psychiatric ward), 1976 (Acute Care Hospital), and 2016.

"SFGH and the University of California, San Francisco School of Medicine (UCSF) have been partners in public health since 1872..."

In 1966, SFGH was designated as the city's trauma center, the second trauma center established in the U.S. after Cook County Hospital.

Chan Zuckerberg building 
In November 2008, San Francisco voters approved an $887.4 million general obligation bond for the General Hospital rebuild, work began in 2009, and was expected to be finished in 2015.

In 2015, Facebook founder and CEO, Mark Zuckerberg, and his wife Priscilla Chan gave $75 million to help fund equipment and technology for the new hospital.
In 2016, the new hospital building was completed. It is the first hospital building in San Francisco to be constructed with a base-isolated foundation, 30 inches in any direction for protection against earthquakes. Publicised improvements included expanding the Emergency Department from 27 to 58 beds, and Operating Rooms from 10 to 13. The number of general admission beds, the number of intensive care unit (ICU) beds increased. The previously separate surgical and medical units were combined into one ICU.

Billing practices

Through early 2019, SFGH did not participate in any private health insurance networks and practiced balance billing. A Vox analysis (derived from a database of more than a thousand emergency room bills) characterized the hospital's billing practices as "aggressive" and "surprising": one privately insured patient arriving at the hospital after a bicycle accident was billed more than $20,000 for diagnostic scans and treatment for a broken arm; the bill was 12 times the Medicare billing rate. After media attention, SFGH changed its billing policy so that privately insured patients would be billed at rates consistent with their insurers' network rates, with an income-based maximum.

Artwork 
The hospital owns and displays two paintings by Frida Kahlo and Diego Rivera, donated to the hospital by Dr. Leo Eloesser. Eloesser interned at SFGH and was Kahlo's physician.

The Pediatric Emergency Department features a mural by artist Sirron Norris entitled The Land of the Helping Hand, which features local iconography.

Notable deaths 
Diane Whipple, American lacrosse player and coach, dog mauling victim.
Kate Steinle, died from gunshot wounds.
Ed Lee, attorney, politician and mayor of San Francisco, died from coronary artery disease, with hypertensive heart disease.
Jack Palladino, investigator and attorney, died from a head injury.

See also
List of hospitals in California
R. Beverly Cole

Further reading

References

External links
Website
SFGH  at SF Dep't of Public Health
SFGH UCSF
SFGH campus maps
Center for Vulnerable Populations
SFGH in the CA Healthcare Atlas, A project by OSHPD
Brain and Spinal Injury Center
Orthopaedic Trauma Institute
SFGH : American Hospital Directory

Hospital buildings completed in 1915
Hospitals in San Francisco
Hospitals in California
Teaching hospitals in California
Mission District, San Francisco
County hospitals in California
Public hospitals in the United States